Army Sports Club Stadium is a multi-use stadium in Odesa, Ukraine. The stadium holds 15,000 people.

The stadium is located close to the Kulykove Pole in Odesa, between Seminarska vulytsia and Pyrohovska vulytsia.

The stadium was built in 1966 in place of the old wooden Kharchovyk Stadium that existed in its place since 1927. The initiative to rebuilt the stadium belonged to the Soviet general Hamazasp Babadzhanian.

The stadium was a home stadium of SKA Odesa and its successor municipal SC Odesa.

See also
 Army Sports Club Stadium (Lviv)

References

External links
 SKA Stadium. World Stadium (Ukraine).

Football venues in Ukraine
Sport in Odesa
Buildings and structures in Odesa Oblast
Sports venues in Odesa Oblast